The Women's moguls competition at the FIS Freestyle Ski and Snowboarding World Championships 2023 was held on 25 February 2023.

Qualification
The qualification was started at 09:30. The best 18 skiers qualified for the final.

Final
The final was started at 11:30.

References

Women's moguls